The 2021 Super Rugby AU season (branded as Harvey Norman Super Rugby AU for sponsorship reasons) was a professional club rugby union tournament organised by Rugby Australia. Announced on 11 November 2020, the tournament was the second season of Super Rugby AU, featuring the same 5 teams from the inaugural 2020 season, and ran from 19 February to 8 May 2021.

The tournament ran parallel to New Zealand's 2021 Super Rugby Aotearoa season, and Super Rugby Trans-Tasman followed the conclusion of both seasons, a crossover tournament featuring each Australian team playing each New Zealand team once, followed by a final.

Law variations 

The 2021 season of Super Rugby AU will see changes to kick-offs and restarts, with a free kick awarded if the a kickoff has not taken place 30 seconds following the opposition scoring, a restart is kicked out on the full or if teammates of the kicker are not behind the ball. The free kick will take place at half way. These rules are similar to those that are currently used in Rugby sevens. Also the 'Golden point' law brought in during the 2020 season is tweaked so that full-time will only occur after a try is scored, rather than any form of points. Penalties and drop goals will still count towards the score during extra time, but will not end the game, with play only ending if a try is scored or the 10-minute extra time period ends. All other law changes from the 2020 season will also occur in the 2021 season.

Standings

Round-by-round
The table below shows the progression of all teams throughout the 2021 Super Rugby AU season. Each team's tournament points on the standings log is shown for each round, with the overall log position in brackets.

Matches

Round 1

Round 2

Round 3

Round 4

Round 5

Round 6

Round 7

Round 8

Round 9

Round 10

Qualifying final

Final

Notes

Statistics

Leading point scorers

Source: Points

Leading try scorers

Source: Tries

Discipline

Players

Squads 

The following 2021 Super Rugby AU squads have been named. Players listed in italics denote non-original squad members.

Referees
The following referees were selected to officiate the 2021 Super Rugby AU season:

References

External links 

 

2021 Super Rugby season
2021 in Australian rugby union
2021 rugby union tournaments for clubs